Akademika Bohomoltsia Street is a street located in the Pecherskyi District, in the Lypky neighborhood of Kyiv. It runs from Shovkovychna Street to Pylyp Orlyk Street.

History
Akademika Bohomoltsia Street originated in the 1830s and 1840s under the name Esplanadna Street (from the esplanade of the New Pechersk Fortress located next to it). In 1869, it was renamed Vynogradna (from the vineyard planted here in the 18th century). At different times, the neighboring streets of Pylypa Orlyka and Lipskyi Lane had the same name. Nowadays, Vynohradnyi Lane exists next to Akademika Bogomoletsa Street. During the German occupation of the city in 1942–1943, the street was known as Waragerstrasse and Vynogradna.

The street received its modern name in 1946, in honor of the Ukrainian physiologist Aleksandr Bogomolets.

Notable buildings
The Ministry of Internal Affairs is located in Akademika Bohomoltsia Street. The Bogomoletz Institute of Physiology is also located in this street and is named after Alexander Bogomolets.

References

Streets in Kyiv